Grangemouth Football Club was a Scottish association football club based in the town of Grangemouth. The club was founded in 1886 and disbanded eight years later in 1894. The club competed in the Scottish Cup between 1887 and 1894. Grangemouth also competed in regional competitions such as the Stirlingshire Cup and Midland Football League.

Grangemouth first entered in the Scottish Cup in 1887, its best result reaching the fourth round in 1889. The club was based at Muirhead Park until 1888 when it moved to Caledonian Park where it remained until 1894.

History 
Grangemouth Football Club was founded in 1886, possibly the second club from the town of Grangemouth to bear the name. The club played its home matches at Muirhead Park in the town.

Grangemouth first entered in the Scottish Cup in the 1887–88 season. In the first round the club was drawn against East Stirlingshire from the nearby village of Bainsford and lost the match 5–2. For the following two seasons, Grangemouth was drawn against Slamannan in the first round; losing 5–3 in 1888 but winning 8–0 a year later to progress to the second round for the first time. Grangemouth went on to beat Camelon and Kilsyth Wanderers before losing to eventual finalists Vale of Leven in the fourth round.

Honours 
Stirlingshire Cup:
 Runners-up (1): 1890–91

Records

Scottish Cup 
 First Scottish Cup match: v East Stirlingshire, 3 September 1887
 Highest winning margin (eight goals): 8–0 v Slamannan, 7 September 1889
 Highest losing margin (six goals): 8–2 v East Stirlingshire, 6 September 1890; 7–1 v Vale of Leven, 9 November 1889; 7–1 v Renton, 25 November 1893

Notes

References 

Defunct football clubs in Scotland
Association football clubs established in 1886
1886 establishments in Scotland
Association football clubs disestablished in 1894
1894 disestablishments in Scotland
Grangemouth